Triantafyllou is a Greek surname. Notable people with the surname include: 

Michael Triantafyllou, Greek mechanical engineer
Panagiotis Triantafyllou, Greek wheelchair fencer
Soti Triantafyllou (born 1957), Greek writer

Greek-language surnames
Surnames
Patronymic surnames